Raigad is a hill fort situated in Mahad, Raigad district of Maharashtra, India. It is one of the strongest fortresses on the Deccan Plateau. It was previously known as Rairee or Rairy fort.

Many constructions and structures on Raigad were built by Chhatrapati Shivaji and the Chief Engineer was Hiroji Indulkar. Chhatrapati Shivaji made it his capital in 1674 upon being crowned the king of the Maratha kingdom, which later developed into the Maratha Empire, eventually covering much of western and central India. 

There are approximately 1,737 steps leading to the fort.

Major features

The main palace was constructed using wood, of which only the base pillars remain. The main fort ruins consist of the queen's quarters, and six chambers, with each chamber having its private restroom. The chambers do not have any windows. In addition, ruins of three watch towers can be seen directly in front of the palace grounds out of which only two remain as the third one was destroyed during a bombardment. The Raigad Fort also has ruins of a market that was accessible to horseback riders. The fort also overlooks an artificial lake known as the Ganga Sagar Lake.

The only main pathway to the fort passes through the "Maha Darwaja" (Huge Door) which was previously closed at sunset.

The king's court, inside the Raigad Fort, has a replica of the original throne that faces the main doorway called the Nagarkhana Darwaja. It faces the East Side. It was here where Shivaji's Rajyabhishek took place. This enclosure had been acoustically designed to aid hearing from the doorway to the throne. A secondary entrance, called the Mena Darwaja on the south side, was supposedly the private entrance for the royal ladies of the fort that lead to the queen's quarters. The convoy of the king and the king himself used the Palkhi Darwaja. on the north side. To the right of Palkhi Darwaja, is a row of three dark and deep chambers. Historians believe that these were the granaries for the fort.

From the fort, one can view the execution point called Takmak Tok, a cliff from which sentenced prisoners were thrown to their death. This area has been fenced off.

A statue of Shivaji is erected in front of the ruins of the main market avenue that leads to the Jagdishwar Mandir, which has Hiroji Indulkar's name engraved on the first step, his own Samadhi and that of his dog named Waghya. The Samadhi of Rajmata Jijabai,  Shivaji's mother, can be seen at the base village of Pachad. Additional famous attractions of the fort include the Khubladha Buruj, Nane Darwaja and the Hatti Talav (Elephant Lake). Henry Oxienden was on the fort from 13 May to 13 June 1674 & he quoted "We arrived at the top of that strong mountain about sunn sett, which is fortified by nature more than art, being off very difficult access, and but one advance to it, which is guarded by two narrow gates, and fortified with a strong high wall, and bastions thereto. All the other parte of the mountaine is a direct precipice, so that it is impregnable except the treachery of some in it betrayes it. On the Mountaine are many strong buildings, as the Rajahs Court,and houses for other Ministers of State, to the number of about 300, It is in length about 21 miles and breadth * a mile, but noe pleasant trees nor any sort of grains growes thereon. Our house was about a mile from the Rajahs Pallaoe, into which wee retired with noe little content."

Hirakani Buruj
The fort has a famous wall called "Hirakani Buruj" (Hirakani Bastion) constructed over a huge steepcliff. The legend goes "that a woman by the name of Hirakani from a nearby village had come to sell milk to the people living at the fort. She happened to be inside the fort when the gates got closed and locked at sunset. Hearing the cries of her infant son back at the village echo after nightfall, the anxious mother couldn't wait till dawn and courageously climbed down the steep cliff in pitch darkness all for the love of her little one. She later repeated this extraordinary feat in front of Shivaji and was rewarded for her bravery." In appreciation of her courage and bravery, Chhatrapati Shivaji built the Hirakani Bastion over this cliff..Hirkani Buruj is important aspect of raigada,it is the symbol of courage.

Incidents
The statue of Shivaji's pet dog was removed by alleged members of the Sambhaji Brigade in July 2012 as a protest but was re-instated by Shri Shivaji Maharaj Raigad Smarak Samiti, the Archaeological Survey of India, sculptor Rambhau Parkhi and the District Administration.

Gallery

See also 
 List of forts in Maharashtra
 Mughal–Maratha Wars

References

External links

 (Raigad Fort Place to See)

Former capital cities in India
Buildings and structures of the Maratha Empire
Forts in Raigad district
16th-century forts in India
Tourist attractions in Pune district
Former populated places in India
Hiking trails in India
Water Heritage Sites in India